Billieturnera is a genus of flowering plants belonging to the family Malvaceae.

Its native range is Texas, Northeastern Mexico.

Species:

Billieturnera helleri

References

Malvaceae
Malvaceae genera